Slovakia first participated at the European Games at the inaugural 2015 Games in Baku, Azerbaijan.

Medal Tables

Medals by Games

Medals by sport

List of medalists

Flag bearers

See also
Slovakia at the Olympics
Slovakia at the Paralympics
Slovakia at the Youth Olympics
Slovakia at the European Youth Olympic Festival
Slovakia at the Universiade
Slovakia at the World Games

References